Whitshed Keene (c. 1731–1822) was an Irish soldier in the British Army and a politician who sat in the House of Commons for 50 years between 1768 and 1818.
  
Keene was born in Ireland, the son of Captain Gilbert Keene and his wife Alice Whitshed, daughter of Thomas Whitshed of Dublin, serjeant-at-law. He was educated at Trinity College, Dublin and was awarded BA in 1750.  He joined the army and was lieutenant in the 5th Foot in 1754, captain in 1756 and major in 1762. He served as lieutenant colonel and then colonel in the Portuguese army. He then went to Paris, and attached himself to Stephen Fox the brother of Charles James Fox. He soon became acquainted with Lord Hertford, then ambassador, and  became his master of the horse and gradually his intimate dependant. He retired from the army in 1768. He married Elizabeth Legge, daughter of George, Viscount Lewisham on  1 August 1771.

Keene was elected Member of Parliament for Wareham at a by-election in November 1768. In 1772 he became Secretary to the Lord Chamberlain, a post he held until March 1782.  In 1774, when he was appointed to the Board of Trade, he was required to undergo re-election but having resigned at Wareham, he was then re-elected at  Ludgershall  where he sat for 6 months. He  seems never to have spoken in the Parliament of 1768–1774.

At the 1774 general election Keene was returned unopposed at Montgomery on the Powis interest. He was returned there for a total of 44 years by three successive members of the Powis-Clive family. In June 1777 he was removed from the Board of Trade to succeed Thomas Worsley as surveyor general at the Board of Works. It was believed that Worsley could scarcely outlive the day, but he lived on until December 1778. Keene took up hs post in January 1779 and was paid £2,000 from secret service funds for his loss of salary etc. of the Board of Trade and election expenses.

In 1780 an opposition to Keene was intended at Montgomery but  the neighbouring country gentleman who was proposed never materialized, and Keene's election was once more unopposed. He made his first speech on record on 28 April 1780 when  he was on his legs three quarters of an hour, giving a full account of the Board of Works, and a detail of works done by it. On the fall of Lord North in March 1782 he lost his positions but was re-appointed secretary to the Lord Chamberlain and made a Lord of the Admiralty in the Coalition Government in April 1783. He lost both places when the coalition was dismissed in December 1783. The few interventions by him in the 1784-1790 parliament all refer to the work of that Board or of the Lord Chamberlain's office. Keene continued to sit for Montgomery for the rest of his parliamentary life on the interest of the Earls of Powis and was returned unopposed in 1784,  1790 and 1796. They could count on his loyalty and ensured his return in the only contest he faced in 1802. He took a very active part in parliament in his later years speaking on various topics until 1816. From then he made no mark in the House and retired in 1818. He died on 27 February 1822  aged 90.

References

1822 deaths
British MPs 1768–1774
British MPs 1774–1780
British MPs 1780–1784
British MPs 1784–1790
British MPs 1790–1796
British MPs 1796–1800
UK MPs 1801–1802
UK MPs 1802–1806
UK MPs 1806–1807
UK MPs 1807–1812
UK MPs 1812–1818
Royal Northumberland Fusiliers officers
Members of the Parliament of Great Britain for English constituencies
Members of the Parliament of Great Britain for Welsh constituencies
Members of the Parliament of the United Kingdom for Welsh constituencies
Year of birth uncertain
Lords of the Admiralty